Rose Island may refer to:

Places

Canada 
Rose Island (Fraser River), adjacent to Kirkland Island, British Columbia
Rose Island (Georgian Bay), an island of Ontario

United States 
Rose Island (Rhode Island), an island in Narragansett Bay
Rose Island Light
Rose Island (amusement park), an abandoned amusement park near Charlestown, Indiana
Rose Atoll, American Samoa
Rose Island, a community in Fairhaven Township, Michigan
Rose Island, an island in the Little Tennessee River opposite the Mialoquo archaeological site

Elsewhere 
Republic of Rose Island, a late-1960s micronation on an artificial platform in the Adriatic Sea
Rose Island (Lake Starnberg), an island in Bavaria, Germany
Rose Island (New Zealand), an island in the Auckland Group
Rose Island, Bahamas
Rose Isle, in the River Thames in Oxfordshire, UK
Sacca Sessola, an island in the Venetian Lagoon, Italy, called "Island of Roses" by the hotel that occupies it
Sir Hugh Rose Island, Andaman and Nicobar Islands, India

Film
Rose Island (film), a 2020 Italian film based on the Republic of Rose Island